State Route 61 (SR 61) is a primary state highway in the U.S. state of Virginia.  The state highway runs  from SR 16 in Tazewell east to U.S. Route 460 (US 460) in Narrows.  SR 61 passes through several narrow creek valleys as it parallels the West Virginia state line through Tazewell, Bland, and Giles counties.  The only sizeable community between the highway's endpoints is Rocky Gap, where the highway meets US 52 and Interstate 77 (I-77).

Route description

SR 61 begins at an intersection with SR 16 in the North Tazewell neighborhood of the town of Tazewell.  SR 16 continues west along Riverside Drive and south as Tazewell Avenue, which heads into the downtown area.  SR 61 parallels the Clinch River east through a four-ramp partial cloverleaf interchange with US 19 and US 460 to the neighborhood of Fourway.  There, SR 61 turns south, meets a Norfolk Southern Railway rail line at grade, and crosses the North Folk Clinch River.  Just south of the river, just east of the confluence of the North and South forks to form the main river, the state highway intersects US 19 Business and US 460 Business (Fincastle Turnpike).

SR 61 leaves the town of Tazewell and curves to the east to follow the South Fork Clinch River through the Clinch Valley between Buckhorn Mountain to the north and Rich Mountain to the south.  The state highway passes through the hamlet of Burtons Shop on its way to the source of the South Folk just west of the Tennessee Valley Divide in the community of Gratton, where the highway intersects SR 623 (Burkes Garden Road), which leads over Rich Mountain to Burkes Garden.  SR 61 continues east along Clear Fork through the community of Shawver Mill and enters Bland County.  The state highway continues east as Clear Fork Creek Road, which passes through Cove Creek, Stowersville, and Clear Creek on the way to Rocky Gap.  SR 61 has a short concurrency with US 52 (Scenic Highway), during the road briefly expands to a four-lane divided highway through a diamond interchange with I-77.  The two highways make a sharp turn north, then split in the center of the village where Clear Fork enters Wolf Creek.

SR 61 continues east as Wolf Creek Road through the valley of Wolf Creek between Buckhorn Mountain to the north and Wolf Creek Mountain to the south.  The highway passes through Round Bottom then enters Giles County.  SR 61 passes through the tiny communities of Day, Phlegar, First Ford, Boxley, Chapel, Penvir, and Shumate on their way to Narrows.  The state highway enters the town as Park Drive, crosses Wolf Creek, and continues as Monroe Street.  North of its intersection with SR 100 (Main Street), SR 61 continues as McArthur Lane, which passes under a Norfolk Southern rail line and crosses over the New River and US 460 (Virginia Avenue).  The state highway turns east onto Fleshman Street and turns south to reach its eastern terminus at an intersection with US 460.

Major intersections

References

External links

Virginia Highways Project: VA 61

061
State Route 061
State Route 061
State Route 061